Walter Tom Cox (1872–1930) was an English footballer who played as a goalkeeper for various clubs around the turn of the 20th century.

Football career
Cox was born in Southampton and started playing for the newly formed Southampton St Mary's club in 1892 as an outfield player. He later converted to a goalkeeper and made his first-team debut when he replaced Jack Barrett in an FA Cup match at the Antelope Ground against Reading on 3 November 1894. Cox retained his place for the next cup match against Marlow before being replaced by H. Williamson.

Cox made his Southern League debut away to Royal Ordnance on 5 October 1895 before Tom Cain took over as the first-choice 'keeper. Although Cain was preferred for League matches, Cox played in all five FA Cup matches, where the club reached the First Round proper for the second consecutive season, going down 3–2 to The Wednesday of the Football League First Division. Despite conceding three goals, Cox "performed heroically" and as a result won County recognition.

Following the arrival of George Clawley, Cox moved to Bristol where, after a season playing for Bristol St George in the Birmingham & District League, he returned to the Southern League with Bedminster in May 1898. In October 1899, he moved on to Millwall Athletic and then to Manchester City in May 1900. At Hyde Road, Cox was used as cover for Charlie Williams and made only one league appearance before moving on to Bury.

He failed to make any first team appearances at either Bury or his next club Preston North End and finished his career in Scotland with Dundee.

References

1872 births
Footballers from Southampton
1930 deaths
English footballers
Association football goalkeepers
Southampton F.C. players
Roman Glass St George F.C. players
Bedminster F.C. players
Millwall F.C. players
Manchester City F.C. players
Bury F.C. players
Preston North End F.C. players
Dundee F.C. players
English Football League players
Southern Football League players